Alan Norman Bold (1943–1998) was a Scottish poet, biographer, journalist and saxophonist. He was born in Edinburgh.

He edited Hugh MacDiarmid's Letters and wrote the influential biography MacDiarmid. Bold had acquainted himself with MacDiarmid in 1963 while still an English Literature student at Edinburgh University. His debut work, Society Inebrious, with a lengthy introduction by MacDiarmid, was published in 1965, during Bold's final university year. This early publication kick-started a prolific poetic career with Bold publishing another three books of verse before the end of the decade, including the ambitious book-length poem The State of the Nation.  He also edited The Penguin Book of Socialist Verse (1970) and published a 1973 biography of Robert Burns.

Alan Bold married an art teacher, Alice. Their daughter Valentina is Robert Burns scholar like her father, who teaches at the University of Glasgow. A lifelong heavy drinker who dealt with the boozy life of the poet in such collections as A Pint of Bitter, Bold died after a short illness in a hospital in Kirkcaldy at the age of 54.

Publications

Poetry
 Penguin Modern Poets 15, 1969.
 Society Inebrious, Mowat Hamilton, Edinburgh 1965
 The Voyage, 1966
 To Find the New, Chatto and Windus, London, 1967
 A Perpetual Motion Machine, Chatto and Windus, London, 1969
 The State of the Nation, Chatto and Windus, London, 1969
 A Pint of Bitter, Chatto and Windus, 1971
 The Malfeasance, Alan Bold 1974
 This Fine Day, Borderline Press, 1979

Other
The Penguin Book of Socialist Verse Penguin, 1970
 Biography of Robert Burns, Pitkin Pictorials Ltd, 1973
 Letters of Hugh MacDiarmid (edited), 1983
 East is West a novel, Keith Murray Publishing, 1991
 Making Love: The Picador Book of Erotic Verse, 1978
 The Bawdy Beautiful: The Sphere Book of Improper Verse, Editor, 1979
 Mounts of Venus: The Picador Book if Erotic Prose, 1980
 The Sensual Scot, Paul Harris Publishing, Editor, 1982

Reviews
 Murray, Glen (1980), review of This Fine Day, in Cencrastus No. 2, Spring 1980, pp. 43 – 45, 
 Czerkawska, Catherine Lucy (1980), review of The Bawdy Beautiful: The Sphere Book of Improper Verse, Cencrastus No. 2, Spring 1980, p. 45
 Anderson, Carol (1983), The Bold Type, review of The Sensual Scot, in Hearn, Sheila G. (ed.), Cencrastus No. 13, Summer 1983, p. 56

External links
Alan Bold at The Scottish Poetry Library biography and appreciation by Richie McCaffery.

References

1943 births
1998 deaths
Scottish Renaissance
20th-century Scottish poets
Scottish male poets
Alumni of the University of Edinburgh
20th-century British male writers
20th-century British writers